The Hirst Research Centre, also known as the GEC Hirst Research Centre or GEC Research Laboratories, was established in 1919 at Wembley, Middlesex, by the General Electric Company.

History
Formally opened in 1923, the site at East Lane, Wembley was one of the first specialised industrial research laboratories to be built in Britain. The centre was named after Hugo Hirst, one of the founders of the company that would become the General Electric Company.

One of the centre's most famous achievements was the production of the cavity magnetron during World War II, the concept of which was established by Randall and Boot working at Birmingham University. Staff of the centre were also important in developing radars for use during the war. The 60 m radio mast at the back of the building became, along with Wembley Stadium, one of the landmarks of the area. Hirst was instrumental in setting up the National Grid system which provides power to the whole of the UK. The centre also worked on the design of electrical power systems for the British railway network.

In the 1990s the organisation moved to Borehamwood, Hertfordshire. After GEC left the Wembley site, it was used as the set for some scenes of the 1995 film The Young Poisoner's Handbook.

Notable Hirst employees and scientists
Clifford Paterson was the organisation's first director, and held that position until his death in 1948. Others working there included:
 Derek Abbott
 Jean Bacon
 David Bevan
 Colin Cherry
 Robert James Clayton
 Paul Hendricks
 Cyril Hilsum
 Daryl E. Hooper
 Daniel McCaughan
 Sanjay Jha
 Bernard de Neumann
 Clifford Copland Paterson
 Michael Pepper
 Derek Roberts
 Bruce Robertson
 Michael John Smith
 Boris Townsend
 Ian Robert Young

See also
 Marconi Research Centre
 GEC-Marconi scientist deaths conspiracy theory

References

External links
 Photo of part of the Hirst building in East Lane, Wembley
 Job advertisement for GEC Hirst Research Center, New Scientist, 7 July 1988, p.80

Companies based in the London Borough of Brent
Engineering research institutes
Former buildings and structures in the London Borough of Brent
General Electric Company
History of electronic engineering
History of telecommunications in the United Kingdom
Research and development in the United Kingdom
Research institutes in London